A Plague Tale: Innocence is an action-adventure stealth game developed by Asobo Studio and published by Focus Home Interactive. It was released for PlayStation 4, Windows, and Xbox One in May 2019. The game was made available on the cloud-based service Amazon Luna in November 2020. The PlayStation 5 and Xbox Series X/S versions of the game were released in July 2021, alongside a cloud-based edition for the Nintendo Switch. 

Set in 14th century Aquitaine, France during the Hundred Years' War, the game focuses on the plight of Amicia de Rune and her ill brother Hugo as they flee from soldiers of the French Inquisition and from hordes of rats that are spreading the black plague. The player controls Amicia, using a combination of stealth and limited tools to hide from, distract, or knock out soldiers, evade rat hordes, and solve puzzles, incorporating elements of survival horror games.

A Plague Tale: Innocence received generally positive reviews from critics and sold over 1 million units by July 2020. A sequel, A Plague Tale: Requiem, was released on Nintendo Switch, PlayStation 5, Windows, and Xbox Series X/S on 18 October 2022, with the Nintendo Switch version also being a cloud-based title.

Gameplay 
In A Plague Tale: Innocence, the player assumes control of Amicia de Rune from a third-person perspective. For the majority of the game, players need to utilize stealth to avoid hostile encounters, as enemies will kill Amicia instantly if they catch her. Amicia is equipped with a sling that can throw rocks to break chains, create distractions, or stun guards long enough for the rats to ambush them; she can also kill enemies with a headshot if their head is unprotected.

The game consists of a series of survival puzzles, which mostly consist of the player having to use specific methods to scare away or distract the hordes of hungry rats in order to gain access to new areas or direct them towards enemies. The primary method of warding rats off is fire, as they will seldom enter within the radius of burning torches and braziers. Amicia can craft special ammunition and supplies, which include fire-starting sulfur stones that ignite braziers, stink bombs that attract rats, or fire suppressants to extinguish torches carried by enemies. Amicia's younger brother, Hugo, can be directed towards specific tasks when Amicia is busy, and can also access certain areas that she cannot. However, this is risky, as Hugo will start to panic if left alone and can attract unwanted attention. Later in the game, the player can assume control of Hugo, who cannot craft items but can control rats and sneak through small spaces.

Plot 
In 1348, Amicia de Rune is a 15-year-old French girl of noble descent who lives in Aquitaine during the Hundred Years' War between England and France. Her 5-year-old brother, Hugo, has been ill since birth; their mother, Beatrice, an alchemist, has sheltered him in their estate while trying to devise a cure. While hunting with her father Robert in the forest, Amicia encounters an unusual substance on the ground, and her dog Lion is gruesomely consumed by an unseen entity. French Inquisition troops, led by Lord Nicholas, arrive at the de Rune estate in search of Hugo, executing Robert and slaughtering the family servants. Beatrice helps her children escape and instructs Amicia to take Hugo to a doctor named Laurentius.

The children flee to a nearby village, where they learn that hordes of rats have been spreading the black plague (known as the Bite). The two are wanted by the Inquisition and have to evade the villagers; Amicia and Hugo eventually reach Laurentius's farm and find him severely ill with the plague. Laurentius implores Amicia to finish her mother's work seconds before the farm is overrun by rats; the siblings flee with Laurentius's apprentice, Lucas, to seek the Chateau d’Ombrage, which once belonged to the de Rune family. As they cross a battlefield patrolled by English soldiers, Lucas explains that Hugo's blood carries a supernatural evil called the Prima Macula, which has lain dormant within certain noble bloodlines since the Plague of Justinian. Beatrice and Laurentius had been trying to find an elixir that would mitigate Hugo's symptoms, while Vitalis Benevent, the Grand Inquisitor of France, seeks to harness Hugo's power so that the Inquisition can rule France. Hugo and Amicia are briefly captured by the English, but escape with the help of sibling thieves Melie and Arthur; Arthur is captured as the others escape to Chateau d’Ombrage.

Lucas needs a forbidden book called the Sanguinis Itinera to complete an elixir that may help Hugo. Amicia infiltrates the university to retrieve the book while Melie rescues her brother. Amicia recovers the book and meets a young blacksmith named Rodric, who helps her escape. Back at the Chateau, Arthur reveals that Beatrice is still alive but imprisoned. Amicia insists they not tell Hugo, but he overhears the conversation. His anger appears to worsen his symptoms, so Amicia and Lucas return to the de Rune estate, looking for Beatrice's research. In a hidden laboratory they complete the elixir and administer it to Hugo to alleviate his symptoms. Angry at his sister for not telling him the truth, Hugo runs away and joins the Inquisition to find Beatrice. Vitalis injects himself with Hugo's blood so that he can possess the power of the Macula, but due to Lucas' elixir, he is unable to fully attain Hugo's powers.

Hugo escapes and finds Beatrice. Before their recapture, she reveals that the Macula gives him the power to control the rats. Vitalis threatens Beatrice's life to force Hugo's powers to fully awaken. Chateau d’Ombrage is then attacked by a swarm of rats guided by Hugo, still angry at Amicia. Nicholas, who is accompanying him, kills Arthur and orders Hugo to kill Amicia, but she convinces her brother to reject the Inquisition, and they work together to battle Nicholas until the rats consume him. The children decide to confront Vitalis.

As they fight their way to the Bastion, Rodric sacrifices himself to protect Hugo and Amicia. Vitalis awaits their arrival, having bred thousands of white rats that only he can control. Hugo ultimately overpowers Vitalis and Amicia kills him. Three days later, both the rats and the plague have disappeared and life begins to return to normal; many remain wary of Hugo and his power, including Melie, who parts ways with the group. Amicia, Hugo, Lucas, and an ailing Beatrice leave in search of a new home.

Development
The game's development was led by Asobo Studio. It is their first original title since the team created the racing game Fuel (2009), and the company wanted to create a narrative-driven experience inspired by The Last of Us and Brothers: A Tale of Two Sons. The main theme of A Plague Tale: Innocence is family and how the characters' relationships are challenged during adverse circumstances. Another important theme is innocence. Hugo, in particular, will observe the player character's behaviors and slowly transform from an innocent boy to a ruthless individual. Child actors Charlotte McBurney and Logan Hannan provided their voice for Amicia and Hugo respectively. The two also participated in the writing process by suggesting changes to dialogue and alternative takes. Up to 5,000 rats can appear on-screen simultaneously. To ensure the game can handle rendering so many enemies without sacrificing performance, the team introduced four layers of details when rendering the rats, in which rats furthest away from the player character exist as a "background, non-animated mesh", whereas the rats closest to the player are animated in detail.

Publisher Focus Home Interactive announced the game in January 2017 as The Plague. A first look game trailer appeared at E3 2017. The game was released worldwide for PlayStation 4, Windows, and Xbox One on 14 May 2019. The game was released for Amazon Luna on 24 November 2020. The Nintendo Switch, PlayStation 5 and Xbox Series X/S versions of the game was released on 6 July 2021. The Nintendo Switch version was playable via cloud.

Downloadable content

The "Coats of Arms" DLC is available for all the three platforms, and came bundled with the pre-order version of the game. It adds three alternate skins for Amicia and Hugo's outfits and coats of arms. The additional content is cosmetic in nature.

Reception

According to review aggregator Metacritic, the game received "generally favorable reviews" from critics. It was the ninth best-selling retail game in the UK in its week of release. In July 2020, Focus Home Interactive announced that the game had sold over 1 million units.

Accolades

Sequel

A sequel, titled A Plague Tale: Requiem, was released on 18 October 2022 for Nintendo Switch, PlayStation 5, Windows, and Xbox Series X/S. The Nintendo Switch version will be a cloud-based game.

Television series
A television series adaptation to be produced by Mediawan in association with Asobo and Focus Home was announced in March 2022.

References

External links 

2019 video games
Action-adventure games
Asobo Studio games
Cloud-based Nintendo Switch games
Focus Entertainment games
Inquisition in fiction
Nintendo Switch games
PlayStation 4 games
PlayStation 5 games
Single-player video games
Stealth video games
Video games about alchemy
Video games about mice and rats
Video games about siblings
Video games about viral outbreaks
Video games developed in France
Video games featuring female protagonists
Video games scored by Olivier Deriviere
Video games set in France
Video games set in the 14th century
Video games set in the Middle Ages
Windows games
Xbox Cloud Gaming games
Xbox One games
Xbox Series X and Series S games
Black Death in fiction